Lake Washington High School is a four-year public high school in Kirkland, Washington, a suburb east of Seattle. It is one of four main high schools in the Lake Washington School District, with an enrollment capacity of approximately 1,500 students. Located in the Rose Hill neighborhood east of downtown Kirkland, LWHS competes in the KingCo 3A athletic conference; the school colors are purple and white and its mascot is the Kangaroo.

History and facilities

Kirkland High School opened in 1922, northwest of downtown Kirkland at the site of Heritage Park. With the formation of the Lake Washington School District in 1944, the high school was given its present name.  It moved to its present location in 1949, with doors opening in January 1950. The former building became the junior high and was later known as Terrace Hall; it burned in a spectacular fire in 1973.

Kirkland's team name was the "Hornets" until 1935, when the class of that year decided to change the mascot to the "Kangaroos".

Nearing six decades in age, the LWHS campus underwent an extended renovation project beginning in the summer of 2008. The new gymnasium opened during the 2009–10 school year, and the main school building was completed during the summer of 2011. The renovation, including school parking lot, was completed in late December 2011, while students were on winter break. The new building was designed to facilitate the newly implemented "house system."

Formerly a senior high school (grades 10–12), LWHS added freshman to its campus in August 2012, and its feeder junior high schools (Kirkland, Rose Hill) were converted to middle schools (grades 6–8).

Notable alumni
 Jill Bakken, Olympic gold medalist (bobsled)
 Carrie Brownstein, musician
 Deb Caletti, author 
 Dan Skipper, NFL player (Houston Texans)
 Craig Caskey, former MLB player (Montreal Expos)
 John Davies (1963) – member of the Alaska House of Representatives from Fairbanks (1993-2003)
 John Fiala, NFL linebacker with the Pittsburgh Steelers (1998–2002)
 Jeremy Enigk, musician
 Dann Gallucci, guitarist for Modest Mouse and other projects
 Matt Hume, retired mixed martial artist; founder and head trainer at AMC Pankration in Seattle
 Nick Hundley, MLB catcher for the Oakland Athletics
 Cathrine Kraayeveld, WNBA player
 Ken Lehman, former MLB player (Brooklyn Dodgers, Baltimore Orioles, Philadelphia Phillies)
 Jason Mesnick, former star of ABC's hit show The Bachelor
 Jeffrey Dean Morgan, actor
 Robin Pecknold, lead vocalist and guitarist for the indie folk band Fleet Foxes
 Skyler Skjelset, guitarist for the indie folk band Fleet Foxes
 Johnny Whitney, musician
 Frank Williams, former MLB player (San Francisco Giants, Cincinnati Reds, Detroit Tigers)
 Lana Wilson, director

References

External links

OSPI school report card, 2011-12 school year
http://www.kangs87.com

High schools in King County, Washington
Schools in Kirkland, Washington
Public high schools in Washington (state)
Educational institutions established in 1923
1923 establishments in Washington (state)